Thirumeni is a village in Kannur district in the Kerala state of India. It is known for its hill station Chathamangalam Hills. The village has several recently migrated families from various parts of the erstwhile political entity (state) of Travancore (mainly from Pathanamthitta Kottayam and Idukki Districts) who settled here in the famed "Malabar migration period" in the nineteenth century. Most of the inhabitants of the village reside in the valley of three major hills by name Chathamangalam Theruvamala alias Alumbumala, Kottathalachimala and Thevarkunnumala. Thirumeni is a small junction with a few government institutions, religious institutions and small shops in int. and is subdivided into smaller villages like Kokkadave, Prapoyil, Chathamangalam (Kannur), Thabore, Muthuvom, Korali, Chattivayal, Thannichal, Paruthikallu etc.

Chathamangalam Hills
Chathamangalam (Kannur) is a magnificent hill-station and tourist hangout in the area. Chathamangalam hills is part of Thirumeni village and is just 3.6 km away from Thirumeni town. Chathamangalam hills can be accessible from Kannur or Payyanur or Kanhangad following the route mentioned below.

1)Kannur-Taliparamba-Alakode-Manjakkadu-Thirumeni-Chathamangalam hills

2)Payyannur-Cherupuzha-Thirumeni-Chathamangalam Hills

3)Kanhangad-Cheemeni-Cherupuzha-Thirumeni-Chathamangalam Hills

Demographics
As of 2011 census, Thirumeni village which spreads over  area had population of 8,616 where 4,275 are males and 4,336 are females with 2,077 families residing in the village. Population of children in the age group of 0–6 was 793 (9.2%) which consists of 428 males and 365 females. Thirumeni had overall literacy of 96.2% where male literacy stands at 97.5% and female literacy was 95%.

Politics
Thirumeni is a place where Hindus and Christians mainly and a few Muslims live in harmony. The place is surrounded by mountains. Many of the families recently migrated from Pathanamthitta, Kottayam and Idukki districts. The main political parties are Communist Party of India (Marxist), INC, Kerala Congress. The nearest educational institutions are Government Higher Secondary School Thirumeni, SNDPLP School.

Transportation
The national highway passes through Perumba junction. Goa and Mumbai can be accessed on the northern side and Cochin and Thiruvananthapuram can be accessed on the southern side. The road to the east of Iritty connects to Mysore and Bangalore. The nearest railway station is Payyanur on Mangalore-Palakkad line. Trains are available to almost all parts of India subject to advance booking over the internet. There are airports at Kannur, Mangalore and Calicut. All of them are international airports but direct flights are available only to Middle Eastern countries.

References

Villages near Payyanur